Solanum quitoense, known as naranjilla ("little orange") in Ecuador, Costa Rica, and Panama and as lulo (from Quechua) in Colombia, is a tropical perennial plant from northwestern South America. The specific name for this species of nightshade means "from Quito."

The lulo plant has large elongated heart- or oval-shaped leaves up to 45 cm in length. The leaves and stems of the plant are covered in short purple hairs. Naranjilla are delicate plants and must be protected from strong winds and direct sunlight. They grow best in partial shade.

The fruit has a citrus flavour, sometimes described as a combination of rhubarb and lime. The juice of the naranjilla is green and is often used as a juice or for a drink called lulada.

Classification
Within the genus Solanum, S. quitoense is a part of the subgenus Leptostemonum. Within this clade, S. quitoense belongs to the section Lasiocarpa. Other species within Lasiocarpa include S. candidum, S. hyporhodium, S. lasiocarpum, S. felinum, S. psudolulo, S. repandum and S. vestissimum.

Solanum quitoense resembles and can be confused with certain other species of Solanum (some closely related to S. quitoense and others less so), including S. hirtum, S. myiacanthum, S. pectinatum, S. sessiliflorum and S. verrogeneum. Furthermore, S. quitoense is somewhat variable in appearance, making identification challenging: at least three varietals (with spines, without spines, and a third variety known as baquicha, which features red-ripening fruits and smooth leaves) are known to occur. One characteristic that is unique to S. quitoense is the ring of green flesh within the ripe fruit. The only related fruit to have green flesh is a cultivated variant of S. lasiocarpum.

The new growth of Solanum quitoense is densely covered in protective trichomes, which vary in color from purple to white.

Agriculture
The naranjilla has been proposed as a new flavoring for the global food industry, but its faring poorly in large-scale cultivation presents an obstacle to its wider use. Its fruit, like tomatoes, is easily damaged when ripe, so is usually harvested unripe. The fruits are found at markets, and locals commonly prepare beverages by adding sugar and water to the freshly squeezed fruits.

Pests and diseases
Solanum quitoense has limited potential in large-scale agriculture due to the plant's extreme vulnerability to pests and diseases when grown as a crop. One common type of infection is caused by the root-knot nematode. The ripe fruit is also very delicate and is frequently attacked by fungus, especially when mechanically damaged, so it is often picked unripe to avoid rotting. S. quitoense-specific vascular wilt is caused by a fungus and leads to flaccid fruits and defoliation.

Hybrids are an increasingly popular solution to the nematode pest problem. S. quitoense has been hybridized with other Solanum species, most commonly with S. sessiliflorum, a plant with similar phenotypic traits. The leaves, flowers and fruits of S. sessiliflorum are similar in form to S. quitoense, but the fruits of the former are larger and yellow; the resulting hybrids have fruits with yellowish fruit pulp.

Nutrition

Contents of the fruit varies from region to region. These statistics are based on Costa Rican fruit:

These statistics are based on fruits found in Colombia and Ecuador:

References

External links

PLANTS National Database Reports and Topics SOQU

Naranjilla in Fruits of Warm Climates by Morton, Julia F. 1987

quitoense
Tropical fruit
Edible Solanaceae
Crops originating from the Americas
Crops originating from Ecuador
Crops originating from Colombia
Crops originating from Peru